Ravi Agrawal (born 16 October 1982) is a journalist, television producer and author of the book India Connected. He is currently the editor in chief of Foreign Policy magazine. Previously, Agrawal worked for the U.S. news channel CNN for 11 years, spanning full-time roles on three continents. His most recent position at the network was as CNN's New Delhi Bureau Chief and correspondent.

Agrawal now lives in New York City.

Career

Foreign Policy 
Agrawal began working at the Washington, D.C.-based magazine and website in April 2018 as its managing editor. He was named Editor in Chief in Nov. 2020. 

Agrawal's essay "India Has a Mindset Problem" was part of a selection of FP articles nominated for the 2020 National Magazine Award for columns and commentary. 

He is a frequent commentator on world affairs on CNN, MSNBC, the BBC, and on NPR.

CNN

New Delhi 
From 2014 to 2017, Agrawal managed CNN's multi-platform news gathering in South Asia.

Agrawal reported regularly on-air for CNN International and CNN.com. He covered a breadth of stories from the region, including economics, foreign policy, and breaking news stories. Agrawal reported for CNN International's award-winning Freedom Project series, including a report on child slaves in rural Uttar Pradesh.

New York
From 2011 to 2014, Agrawal lived and worked in New York City. He was the senior producer of CNN's Sunday world affairs program Fareed Zakaria GPS.
Agrawal was part of the program's 2012 Peabody Award-winning team, as well as its three Emmy nominated programs across 2012 and 2013.

London
Agrawal began his career in TV journalism at CNN International in 2006, where he worked across the network's news and business programs. In 2009, he helped launch the London prime time program Connect the World and served as its senior producer.

Book
Agrawal's India Connected: How the Smartphone is Transforming the World's Biggest Democracy released in September 2018 in India, November 2018 in the United States, and January 2019 in the United Kingdom.

Writing for the Wall Street Journal, novelist Megha Majumdar picked India Connected as among the "five best" books on India today. A review in the UK's Financial Times described the book as "timely and absorbing" and "hard to put down", while the New Statesman's reviewer Oliver Balch called it "smart, sympathetic, and highly readable." India Today said "most books on India's tech and telecom boom quickly get dated. The stories in India Connected are timeless and will age well into nice snapshots of history."

Personal

Agrawal was born in London, England and raised in Calcutta, India. After finishing high school in India, he attended college at Harvard University in Cambridge, MA, where he worked for The Harvard Crimson.

He married Emma Vaughn in 2013.

Until 2016, Agrawal was a Young Global Shaper with the World Economic Forum, and has served a two-year term on the group's Global Agenda Council on India.

In 2016, Agrawal was named an Asia 21 Young Leader by the Asia Society in New York.

References

CNN people
The Harvard Crimson people
Indian male journalists

1982 births
Living people
Foreign Policy editors